The Cabinet of Dr. Fritz was a 1984 binaural radio drama series produced by Thomas Lopez and the ZBS Foundation for NPR. At the beginning of each show, it was suggested that listeners wear headphones.

Production
“Fritz” was the nickname Lopez gave to the human head-shaped microphone he and his team used to record their three-dimensional productions, but its official name was the Neumann Ku81 Dummy Head. A solid rubber head with microphones set inside the ear chambers, it was designed to record sounds the way a human being would hear them.

While the ZBS Foundation had been working with 3D sound since its founding in 1970, The Cabinet of Dr. Fritz series grew out of ZBS’ adaptation of Sticks, a Karl Edward Wagner short horror story set inside an abandoned house. Lopez recorded the drama on location, with actors performing for the dummy head microphone in an actual abandoned house across the Hudson River from where he lived. The binaural sound was such a great fit for the horror genre that Lopez set out to create an entire series of creepy stories recorded in 3D sound.

The series was produced with funds provided by the New York State Council on the Arts, the National Endowment for the Arts and the Corporation for Public Broadcasting through National Public Radio Satellite Program Development Fund.

Reception
Reviews were generally favorable. In Stereophile, Thomas J. Norton wrote of Sticks: 

John Sunier's review in Audio:

Episodes 
Below is a complete list of the show's 13-episode run.

References

External links
"Binaural in Depth" by John Sunier
ZBS Foundation

American radio dramas
ZBS Foundation
1980s American radio programs
Binaural recordings
NPR programs
1984 radio programme debuts
1984 radio programme endings